Final Battle 2014 was the 13th Final Battle professional wrestling pay-per-view event produced by Ring of Honor (ROH). It took place on December 7, 2014 at the Terminal 5 in New York City, New York.

Storylines
Final Battle 2014 featured eight professional wrestling matches, which involved different wrestlers from pre-existing scripted feuds, plots, and storylines that played out on ROH's television programs. Wrestlers portrayed villains or heroes as they followed a series of events that built tension and culminated in a wrestling match or series of matches.

Results

See also
List of Ring of Honor pay-per-view events

References

External links
Ring of Honor's official website

Ring of Honor pay-per-view events
Events in New York City
2014 in New York City
2014
Professional wrestling in New York City
December 2014 events in the United States
2014 Ring of Honor pay-per-view events